Malvani is a dialect of Konkani with significant Marathi influences and loanwords. Although Malvani does not have a unique script, the Devanagari script is used by most speakers. Malvani is sometimes used for sarcastic newspaper articles and local folk stage dramas known as Dashavatar.

Difference from standard Marathi
All pronouns have a change from la to ka. Words in Marathi for  "yes", "this", "that", "where", "here", "there", have different Malvani counterparts. Other grammatical nuances differ from standard Marathi.

Geographical distribution
Malvani is spoken only in the Sindhudurg district of Maharashtra. The language is also spoken in north Goa, especially Pernem taluka. The Census Board of India counts Malvani as a Konkani dialect (which is official language of State of Goa), and according to them, there are around 46851 Malvani speakers throughout the country, with 24 lakh (2.4 million) Konkani living speakers. According to unofficial reports, around 8,68,825 (868,825) Malvani speakers live throughout the Sindhudurg district. It is a very famous dialect of Konkani in the southern part of Konkan in Maharashtra.

Malvani in popular culture
The first ever Drama (Natak) was Vastraharan, which got huge popularity starring Macchindra Kambli. 

The Zee Marathi channel's February 2016 serial Ratris Khel Chale was a horror TV serial on the life of the Naik family from Malvan, and used Malvani as the main dialect. 

In January 2019, Ratris Khel Chale 2 was streamed in Malvani, as well as Gaav Gata Gajali which became popular for its focus on Malvani Culture & Lifestyle. In March 2021, Ratris Khel Chale 3 started streaming. 

In 2019, movie named Picasso was released on Amazon prime which was based on the story of struggling artist of dashavtar (malvani art form).

Other noted Marathi movies based on Malvani culture are Narbachi Wadi (2013), Murder Mestry (2015), and Redu (2017).

See also
Malvan region
Malvani people
Malvani cuisine
Malvan
Sawantwadi
Sindhudurg District

References

External links
http://konkanionline.blogspot.com/

language
Konkan
Konkani